The Singapore People's Alliance was a political coalition in Singapore founded in 1958, comprising the Labour Front and Liberal Socialist Party. It has never won any seats in the Parliament of Singapore. However, the party did win 4 seats to the Singaporean Legislative Assembly in  the general election of 1959 under the leadership of former Chief Minister Lim Yew Hock, with a popular vote of 107,755 or 20.7% of the total number of votes. Following the election, the Liberal Socialist Party merged into it.

After the entry of Singapore into Malaysia in the context of merger, it did not play a significant role in the national referendum of 1962 which approved the merger. It contested the general election of 1963 as part of the conservative Singapore Alliance Party, which was a branch of the federal Alliance Party. Its presence within the Singapore Alliance sparked friction with elements of the Singapore branch of the United Malay National Organisation.

The Singapore Alliance fared poorly during the elections against the incumbent People's Action Party (PAP) with the Singapore's People Alliance losing all four seats.  This has been partly attributed by historian Albert Lau to the failure of Lim Yew Hock to stand in the elections.  Meanwhile, the political focus shifted towards the PAP–UMNO rivalry within Malaysia and rivalry between the PAP and the Barisan Sosialis.

The Singapore People's Alliance was eventually dissolved in 16 May 1965.

References

External links
Background of Singapore People's Alliance
Labour Front

Defunct political parties in Singapore
Political parties established in 1958
Political parties disestablished in 1965
1958 establishments in Singapore
1965 disestablishments in Singapore